The 2018–19 Croatian Second Football League (also known as Druga HNL and 2. HNL) was the 28th season of the Croatian Second Football League, the second-level football competition for men's association football teams in Croatia, since its establishment in 1992. The season started on 24 August 2018 and ended in May 2019.

The league is contested by 14 teams and played in a double round robin format, with each team playing every other team twice over 26 rounds.

Teams
On 23 April 2018, Croatian Football Federation announced that the first stage of licensing procedure for 2018–19 season was completed. For the 2018–19 Druga HNL, only six clubs outside of top level were issued a second level license: Dinamo Zagreb II, Gorica, Hajduk Split II, Lučko, Osijek II and Sesvete. In the second stage of licensing procedure clubs that were not licensed in the first round appealed the decision.

The following teams have mathematically secured their place in the 2018–19 Druga HNL.

Stadia and locations

Number of teams by county

League table

Results

Top scorers

See also
2018–19 Croatian Football Cup
2018–19 Croatian First Football League

References

External links
Official website  

2018-19
Cro
2